CHSM (1250 AM, AM 1250 Radio) is a radio station broadcasting an easy listening format. Licensed to Steinbach, Manitoba, Canada, it serves southeastern Manitoba. It began broadcasting at 7 pm on April 16, 1964 and was originally owned and operated by Southern Manitoba Broadcasting Co. Ltd. The station is currently owned by Golden West Broadcasting. This station is also targeted to the nearby Winnipeg market, but since CFRW flipped to sports in 2010, CHSM is the only AM music station in Winnipeg.

The station simulcasts some programming from its sister stations CFAM and CJRB.

CHSM is a sister station to CILT-FM and Country 107.

References

External links
AM 1250 Radio
 

HSM
HSM
CHSM
Radio stations established in 1964
1964 establishments in Manitoba